Eleni Artymata (born 16 May 1986 in Paralimni) is a track and field sprint athlete, who competes internationally for Cyprus.

Biography
Artymata represented Cyprus at the 2008 Summer Olympics in Beijing. She competed at the 200 metres, where she reached the second round. She won two medals, a gold in the 200 m and a bronze in the 100 m at the Mediterranean Games in Pescara. She also won two gold at the 2005 Games of the Small States of Europe.

At the 2009 World Athletics Championships, she reached the final of the 200 metres, where she finished 8th. She recorded her personal best in the 200 m of 22.64 seconds in the semi finals of the same event.

At the 2010 European Championships in Barcelona. Artymata finished sixth in the final, improving her own national record to 22.61.

Later in 2010, at the Commonwealth Games in Delhi, India, Artymata was one of the favourites for the 200 metres title. She was the fastest qualifier in the heats in 23.23. However, she was disqualified after winning her semi final in 23.15, for running out of her lane. The final was won by Cydonie Mothersill in 22.89.

At the 2012 Summer Olympics, she reached the semi-finals of the 200 m.  That year at the European Championships, she reached the final.

In 2013, Artymata won her second Mediterranean Games 200 metres title in Mersin. She had previously won in Pescara in 2009. Her third gold medal in the competition came in 2018 in Tarragona, this time in the 400 metres, in a National record time of 51.19, beating Italy‘s two-time European Champion Libania Grenot.

Personal bests

References

External links

1986 births
Living people
Olympic athletes of Cyprus
Athletes (track and field) at the 2008 Summer Olympics
Athletes (track and field) at the 2012 Summer Olympics
Athletes (track and field) at the 2016 Summer Olympics
Athletes (track and field) at the 2020 Summer Olympics
Athletes (track and field) at the 2010 Commonwealth Games
Athletes (track and field) at the 2018 Commonwealth Games
Commonwealth Games competitors for Cyprus
Cypriot female sprinters
People from Paralimni
Mediterranean Games gold medalists for Cyprus
Mediterranean Games silver medalists for Cyprus
Mediterranean Games bronze medalists for Cyprus
Athletes (track and field) at the 2009 Mediterranean Games
Athletes (track and field) at the 2013 Mediterranean Games
Athletes (track and field) at the 2018 Mediterranean Games
Mediterranean Games medalists in athletics
Olympic female sprinters